The Kingsley School   is an independent girls' day school situated in Leamington Spa, Warwickshire, England, just to the north of the town centre. It educates girls from 3 to 18; the co-educational Preparatory School also takes boys up to the age of 11.

The senior school occupies an adapted and extended Victorian manor house. On the opposite side of the road the Junior School can be found. The nearby sixth form centre is self-contained, although retains the friendly atmosphere of the main school. The playing fields occupy a site on the outskirts of the town. It was founded as a Church of England school, and now welcomes pupils of all faiths and of none.

History
The school was founded as Leamington High School in 1884 by Rose Kingsley, daughter of Charles Kingsley, author of The Water Babies. It moved to its present site in 1922, and took its present name in 1949.

Headteachers 
1884 - 1886 Florence Gadesden

1886 - 1909 Mary Huckwell

1909 - 1916 Anne Loveday

1916 - 1932 Lilias Milroy

1932 - 1961 Dorothy Sweet

1961 - 1977 Nesta Jones

1977 - 1988 Cynthia Fairhurst

1988 - 1997 Margaret Webster

1997 - 2010 Christine Mannion-Watson

2010–2020 Heather Owens

2020-2022 Christina McCullough

2022-Present James Mercer-Kelly

References

External links
 Official Web Site
 Independent Schools Inspectorate Report
 Kingsley Gallery

Girls' schools in Warwickshire
Private schools in Warwickshire
Schools in Leamington Spa
Educational institutions established in 1884
1884 establishments in England